The Babe Ruth Home Run Award was an annual award presented to the previous season's leading home run hitter in Major League Baseball (MLB). The award was named after the legendary Babe Ruth, who led the American League in homers 12 times. It was first awarded to Mark McGwire after his record-setting 1998 season.

The Babe Ruth Home Run Award was developed by brothers Jim and Brian Sullivan. Jim was the sculptor, while Brian focused on the marketing of the award. The Sullivans originally wanted to create a life-size statue of Ruth as a tourist attraction similar to the Michael Jordan statue. Unable to secure a sponsor, they created the award to honor Ruth. The trophy was estimated to cost around $4,000 as of 2006, and it was funded by the Sullivans and given on behalf of their company, Sullivan Artworks based in Weymouth, Massachusetts. MLB was not interested in sponsoring the award; the American League already honored its home run champion with a nameless award, and the National League offered the Mel Ott Award. Both the awards received little publicity. The Babe Ruth Home Run Award was usually presented to the recipient by Ruth's daughter, Julia Ruth Stevens, or her son, Tom Stevens.

Key

List of winners

See also
List of Major League Baseball annual home run leaders
, awards by organizations other than MLB
Josh Gibson Legacy Award, major league home run award from the Negro Leagues Baseball Museum
Joe Bauman Home Run Award, minor league baseball home run award

Notes

References

External links
Babe Ruth Home Run Award photos at BabeRuthCentral.com

Babe Ruth
Major League Baseball trophies and awards
Awards established in 1998
1998 establishments in Massachusetts
Awards disestablished in 2009